KBS Hall is a concert hall in the Korean Broadcasting System headquarters located in Yeouido, Seoul in South Korea.

Events
2012
ABU TV Song Festival 2012 — October 14

2018
Astro: The 2nd ASTROAD to Seoul [STAR LIGHT] — December 22-23

2022
Golden Child: 2022 Golden Child Concert - Play — February 5-6
WEi: 2022 WEi Concert [First Love] — April 16-17
Fromis 9: 2022 fromis_9 Concert <Love From.> — September 30 and October 1-2

2023
Nightwish: Human. :II: Nature. World Tour — January 23
Itzy: ITZY The 2nd Fan Meeting "ITZY, MIDZY, Let's Fly! To Wonder World" — February 19

External links
Official Site 

Theatres in South Korea
Concert halls in South Korea
Korean Broadcasting System
Music venues in Seoul
Music venues completed in 1991